Tiberia nitidula is a species of sea snail, a marine gastropod mollusk in the family Pyramidellidae, the pyrams and their allies.

Description
The length of the shell measures 7 mm.

Distribution
This species occurs in the Atlantic Ocean off the Azores and Puerto Rico at a depth of 713 m.

References

 Higo, S., Callomon, P. & Goto, Y. (1999) Catalogue and Bibliography of the Marine Shell-Bearing Mollusca of Japan. Elle Scientific Publications, Yao, Japan, 749 pp.

External links

Pyramidellidae
Gastropods described in 1860